The 2022 Tyrolean state election was held on 25 September 2022 to elect the members of the Landtag of Tyrol. Incumbent Governor Günther Platter of the Austrian People's Party (ÖVP) retired at the election; Anton Mattle was the party's lead candidate.

The ÖVP suffered its worst-ever result in the state, winning less than 35% of votes, but remained well ahead of the other parties and performed substantially better than most opinion polling had predicted. The Greens also recorded a decline, while all opposition parties grew in support. The Freedom Party of Austria (FPÖ) overtook the Social Democratic Party of Austria (SPÖ) as the second-largest party for the first time, though they remained tied on seven seats each. Citizens' Forum Tyrol improved to 10%, though this was below expectations. NEOS retained its two seats with a small positive swing. Overall, the ÖVP lost three seats and the Greens one, leaving the incumbent coalition without a majority. ÖVP leader Anton Mattle ruled out a coalition with the FPÖ. All parties indicated they were open to government negotiations.

Background
In the 2018 election, the ÖVP remained the largest party with 44.3% of votes and formed a coalition with the Greens. After Governor Günther Platter announced his retirement from politics in June 2022, the government agreed to hold early elections in September.

Electoral system
The 36 seats of the Landtag of Tyrol are elected via open list proportional representation in a two-step process. The seats are distributed between nine multi-member constituencies, corresponding to the districts of Tyrol. For parties to receive any representation in the Landtag, they must either win at least one seat in a constituency directly, or clear a 5 percent state-wide electoral threshold. Seats are distributed in constituencies according to the Hare quota, with any remaining seats allocated using the D'Hondt method at the state level, to ensure overall proportionality between a party's vote share and its share of seats.

Contesting parties
The table below lists parties represented in the previous Landtag.

In addition to the parties already represented in the Landtag, three parties collected enough signatures to be placed on the ballot.

 MFG Austria – People Freedom Fundamental Rights (MFG)
 Communist Party of Austria (KPÖ) – on the ballot only in Innsbruck and Innsbruck-Land
 Join In – The List for All Others (MACH MIT) – on the ballot only in Innsbruck-Land

Campaign

The Tyrol state election was the first major (regional) election after the resignation of former Austrian Chancellor Sebastian Kurz and the following ÖVP-Green government reshuffle at the national level, therefore being a test case for all major state elections that will follow in 2023 (Lower Austria, Carinthia and Salzburg). The election campaign was primarily impacted by the retirement of longtime governor Günther Platter and the questionable management of the state during the onset of the Covid-19 pandemic in Ischgl and following events. More recently, the campaign was impacted by the rising prices in general and skyrocketing electricity prices in particular, as well as the general massive unpopularity of the Austrian federal ÖVP-Green government.

Opinion polling

Preliminary results

Results by constituency

Aftermath
On 3 October, the ÖVP decided to start coalition talks with the SPÖ. The new ÖVP-SPÖ government was sworn into office on 25 October 2022.

Notes

References

External links
Landtagswahl 2022 | Landesergebnis (Tyrol state election 2022 | State Result)

Tyrol (state)
State elections in Austria
2022 elections in Austria